Archips alberta is a species of moth of the family Tortricidae first described by James Halliday McDunnough in 1923. It is found in North America, where it has been recorded across boreal Canada, south through the mountains to Utah. The habitat consists of coniferous forests.

The wingspan is 22–25 mm. The forewings are light grey to pinkish grey with thin dark lines and brown to grey bands that are edged by black lines. The hindwings are yellowish with darker grey reticulations. Adults are on wing from early July to mid-August.

The larvae feed on Picea mariana, Picea glauca and Picea engelmannii. Young larvae mine needles and web adjacent needles together. Older larvae feed on foliage and cones. The larvae are greyish green to cream with a black head. The species overwinters as a first instar larva. Pupation takes place in a web.

References

Moths described in 1923
Archips
Moths of North America